The Becquerel Prize is a prize to honour scientific, technical or managerial merits in the field of photovoltaic solar energy. It has been established in 1989 by the European Commission at the occasion of the 150th anniversary of a groundbreaking experiment by Alexandre-Edmond Becquerel, also known as Edmond Becquerel, in which he discovered the photovoltaic effect. The prize is awarded to a single individual who is recognized for continuous achievements in the field of photovoltaic energy conversion. The prize is primarily a European award but not restricted exclusively to European citizens. The prize is granted by the European Commission. The Becquerel Prize Committee selects the individual to be honoured. The prize is awarded periodically at the annual European Photovoltaic Solar Energy Conference.

Prize winners 
The Becquerel Prize Committee lists the following winners: 
1989   Prof. Roger Van Overstraeten
1991 	Prof. Werner H. Bloss  
1992 	Prof. Antonio Luque Lopez  
1994 	Dr. Morton Prince  
1995 	Dr. Karlheinz Krebs   
1997 	Prof. Adolf Goetzberger   
1998 	Dr. Walter Sandtner   
2000 	Frederick C. Treble
2001 	Prof. Viacheslav Andreev   
2002 	Dr. Wolfgang Palz
2003 	Prof. Masafumi Yamaguchi  
2004 	Prof. Joachim Luther 
2005 	Dr. Dieter Bonnet
2006 	Dr. Richard M. Swanson
2007   Prof. Arvind Victor Shah
2008   Mechtild Rothe, politician 
2009   Dr. Andreas W. Bett 
2010   Prof. Hans-Werner Schock 
2011   Prof. Wim Sinke 
2012   Dr. Winfried Hoffmann
2013   Prof. Gabriel Sala  
2014   Dr. Stefan Glunz 
2015   Prof. Andrés Cuevas
2016   Prof. Christophe Ballif 
2017   Dr. Stefan Nowak 
2018   Prof. Peter Wuerfel
2019   Dr. Pierre Verlinden
2020   Prof. Henry Snaith
2021 Ulrike Jahn
2022 Marko Topic

See also

 List of physics awards

References 

Awards established in 1989
Solar energy
European science and technology awards
1989 establishments in Europe